Betty Noël (born 1 September 1988) is a French-born Luxembourger footballer who plays as a defender for Division 2 Feminine club VGA Saint-Maur (France) and the Luxembourg women's national team. Noël started playing football as a child in Australia. Back to France she joined the under 16 team of VGA Saint-Maur, before joining the reserve team of Paris Saint-Germain. She then played in Division 2 in Issy-les-Moulineaux (France) before getting a severe knee injury. After surgery, Noël joined Division 2 Tremblay FC and RC Saint-Denis (France).

International career
Noël made her senior debut for Luxembourg on 9 November 2019 during a 0–5 friendly loss to Kosovo. She started the game against Bulgaria women's national football team on the 20 September 2020 as the captain of the team.

References

4. "Betty Noël" [https://www.wort.lu/de/sport/noel-und-die-begeisterung-fuer-die-flf-auswahl-5f9ae0adde135b923610d537 "Noël und die Begeisterung für die FLF-Auswahl"] (in German). Retrieved 30 October 2020.

1988 births
Living people
Women's association football defenders
Luxembourgian women's footballers
Luxembourg women's international footballers
French women's footballers
Footballers from Paris
Paris Saint-Germain Féminine players